Antonio Carlos de Mello Machedo (born in Brazil) is a Brazilian retired footballer.

Career

Alongside five other Brazilians, de Mello arrived in Indonesia even though they were told their destination was Malaysia. Later, he signed with Petrokimia Putra even after being told it was a bad team, helping them reach the 1994/95 league final. 

Nicknamed 'The Duck' due to appearing overweight and slow, De Mello endeared himself to fans in Indonesia with his composure and passing, earning comparisons to England international Matt Le Tissier.

References

Living people
Brazilian footballers
Association football midfielders
1967 births
Brazilian football managers
Persebaya Surabaya players
PSM Makassar players
Persita Tangerang players